St. Jude Thaddeus Institute of Technology is a private college in the Philippines. Its main campus is located along Borromeo St., Brgy Taft., Surigao City.

Programs and courses

College
Bachelor of Arts in Broadcasting Broadcasting
Bachelor of Elementary Education English
Bachelor of Secondary Education English
Bachelor of Science in Business Administration
Bachelor of Science in Criminology
Bachelor of Science in Customs Administration

Senior High School
Accountancy, Business, and Management (ABM)
General Academic Strand (GAS)
Humanities and Social Sciences (HUMSS)
Science, Technology, Engineering, and Mathematics (STEM)

Media operations
SJTIT also operates radio and TV stations in Mindanao and Visayas under its name.

Radio stations

TV Stations

References

External links
St. Jude Thaddeus Institute of Technology

Universities and colleges in Surigao del Norte
Schools in Surigao City